Association football, also known as football and previously known as soccer, is a popular recreational sport in New Zealand. The sport is administered in New Zealand by the governing body New Zealand Football (NZF). This is a list of association football clubs that play in the top leagues in New Zealand and Australia.

Administration
New Zealand is divided up into six regional federations that help in the administration and promotion of the sport in New Zealand:

Federation One (Northern Region Football) - Northland, Auckland
Federation Two (Waikato-Bay of Plenty Football) - Waikato, Bay of Plenty and King Country
Federation Three (Central Football) - Gisborne, Hawke's Bay, Taranaki, Manawatū-Whanganui
Federation Four (Capital Football) - Greater Wellington, including the Kapiti Coast and Wairarapa
Federation Five (Mainland Football) - Tasman, Marlborough, Nelson, West Coast, Northern and Central Canterbury
Federation Six (Footballsouth) - South Canterbury, Otago, Southland

A-League

The Wellington Phoenix is managed under New Zealand Football itself rather than one of the federations. The only professional football club in New Zealand, the Wellington Phoenix play in the Australian A-League.

New Zealand National League
The New Zealand National League is the top men's football league in the New Zealand league system. Founded in 2021, the New Zealand National League is the successor to the New Zealand Football Championship. The league will be contested by ten teams, with teams qualifying from their regional leagues. Four teams will qualify from the Northern League, three qualify from the Central League, two qualify from the newly formed Southern League and the Wellington Phoenix Reserves are given an automatic spot each year.

The regional leagues runs from March through to September, with varying number of games in each region. The Championship phase runs after the completion of the regional leagues with each team playing each other once, followed by a grand final. Each season, two clubs gain qualification to the OFC Champions League, the continental competition for the Oceania region.

Regional competition
Premier winter club competitions is divided into three regional leagues:
 The Northern League, consisting of teams from Federations One (Northland, Auckland) and Two (Waikato/Bay of Plenty)
 The Central League, consisting of teams from Federations Three (Central North Island) and Four (Greater Wellington)
 The Southern League, consisting of teams from Federation Five and Federation Six
 The Capital Football W-League, is a Women's Football league consisting of teams from Federations Four (Central North Island) and Five (Greater Wellington)

Alphabetically
The divisions are correct for the 2022 season and the levels are stated as per the New Zealand football league system.

Key



A

B

C

D

E

F

G

H

I

K

L

M

N

O

P

Q

R

S

T

U

V

W

Z

Notes

See also
Football in New Zealand

References

 
New Zealand
clubs
Association football